Rise Up is the ninth studio album by American rock band Saliva. The record was released on April 29, 2014. It was also the last studio album by Saliva under Rum Bum Records and is the last to feature bassist Dave Novotny who was replaced by Brad Stewart. The album charted at 158 on the Billboard 200.

Background
The record is a re-release of their previous album In It to Win It. It features all of its songs except "Animal", "Flesh", and "I.D.N.A.E". Previous vocalist Josey Scott left the band in 2012 and was replaced with Bobby Amaru.

Track listing
*Mastered by Ted Jensen at Sterling Sound, NYC

Personnel
Bobby Amaru – lead vocals
Wayne Swinny – lead guitar
Jonathan Montoya - rhythm guitar
Dave Novotny – bass, backing vocals
Paul Crosby – drums

References

External links

2014 albums
Saliva (band) albums